Stubbs is an unincorporated community in Spotsylvania County in the U.S. state of Virginia. Stubbs Bridge is named after it.

External links
Official site of Spotsylvania County.

Unincorporated communities in Spotsylvania County, Virginia
Unincorporated communities in Virginia